Jokela is a town in Tuusula, Finland.

Jokela may refer to:

 Jokela railway station
 Jokela (surname), a common Finnish surname
 Late-onset spinal motor neuronopathy, or Jokela-type spinal muscular atrophy